Good Morning, Mickey! is an American animated television series produced by Walt Disney Productions. It was first aired on April 18, 1983 when Disney Channel was launched. It was one of the Disney Channel's first original programs, and the first program to air at the channel's launch. It featured  Disney animated shorts. Although Mickey Mouse shorts were the primary programming, additional cartoons featuring Goofy, Donald Duck, Chip 'n' Dale, Pluto, and others were also shown. Its time-slot for its early run was at 7 a.m. Eastern/Pacific Time, making it the first program of The Disney Channel's 16 (later 18) hour programming day. Later on, its time-slot was changed to 7:30 a.m. ET/PT, making it the second program of the channel's programming day. A similar show that premiered later on The Disney Channel was Donald Duck Presents. Good Morning, Mickey! was replaced by Mickey's Mouse Tracks in 1992.

Episode list

Home media
This show was released on VHS in the UK as part of a six-volume set which also each featured an episode of Welcome to Pooh Corner, The Mouse Factory, Donald Duck Presents and Mousercise. Each tape contained one Disney cartoon short.

Volume One contains "Bone Trouble"
Volume Two contains "Lion Down"
Volume Three contains "Mickey's Garden"
Volume Four contains "Mr. Mouse Takes a Trip"
Volume Five contains "Symphony Hour"
Volume Six contains "R'coon Dawg"

References

External links
 

1983 American television series debuts
1992 American television series endings
1980s American animated television series
1990s American animated television series
1980s American anthology television series
1990s American anthology television series
American children's animated anthology television series
English-language television shows
Disney Channel original programming
Disney animated television series